Nathan Connor Harness (born 19 January 2000) is an English footballer who plays as a goalkeeper for  club Charlton Athletic.

Career

Charlton Athletic
Harness joined Charlton Athletic from Dunstable Town on 1 July 2019.

He made his debut for Charlton Athletic on 31 August 2021 in a 6–1 EFL Trophy victory over Crawley Town.
On the 29 April 2022, due to illness for Charlton number one Craig MacGillivray, Harness played the full 90 minutes of Charlton’s last game of the season against Ipswich Town at Portman Road, where the Addicks got thrashed 4-0.

Billericay Town (loan)
Harness joined Billericay Town on a month's loan on 7 January 2020 where he made four appearances.

Welling United (loan)
Harness joined Welling United on a loan on 8 December 2020 where he made two appearances.

Dulwich Hamlet (loan)
On 22 January 2022, Harness joined Dulwich Hamlet on a month's loan.

Bromley (loan)
On 25 October 2022, Harness joined Bromley on a 28-day loan.

Harness was recalled by Charlton on 17 November 2022, having not made an appearance for Bromley.

Career statistics

References

External links
 

2000 births
Living people
Association football goalkeepers
Charlton Athletic F.C. players
Billericay Town F.C. players
Welling United F.C. players
Dulwich Hamlet F.C. players
Bromley F.C. players
English footballers